Rudolf Mayer (13 October 1837 – 12 August 1865) was a Czech poet. He was a member of the Májovci group of Czech novelists and poets and is best known for his poem "Midday" ("V poledne").

References

External links
 

1837 births
1865 deaths
People from Klatovy District
19th-century Czech poets
Czech male poets